Monocacy Creek is a  tributary of the Schuylkill River in Berks County, Pennsylvania, in the United States. Monocacy Creek joins the Schuylkill at Monocacy Station.

Monocacy is a name derived from a Native American language purported to mean "stream with large beds".

See also
List of rivers of Pennsylvania

References

Rivers of Berks County, Pennsylvania
Rivers of Pennsylvania
Tributaries of the Schuylkill River